Lophoteles is a genus of flies in the family Stratiomyidae.

Species
Lophoteles brevcispinus Rozkošný, 2013
Lophoteles cheesmanae James, 1950
Lophoteles costalis James, 1977
Lophoteles dentata James, 1948
Lophoteles elongata James, 1977
Lophoteles fascipennis Kertész, 1914
Lophoteles glabrifrons James, 1977
Lophoteles laticeps James, 1977
Lophoteles latipennis James, 1977
Lophoteles longispinus Rozkošný, 2013
Lophoteles plumula Loew, 1858
Lophoteles vittata James, 1977
Lophoteles vittipennis (Lindner, 1937)

References

Stratiomyidae
Brachycera genera
Taxa named by Hermann Loew
Diptera of Asia
Diptera of Australasia